Life is Beautiful  is the fourth  studio album by Japanese pop-rock band Chicago Poodle. It was released on 24 September 2014 by Giza Studio label.

Charting
The theme of the album is "life".

The album consists of previously one normal and two digitally released singles.

Several artist from Giza Studio such as Yumemoto Tsuresawa from Japanese rock band WAR-ED, Yuuzo Ohkusu from instrumental band Sensation or the former members of the Japanese pop band Garnet Crow, Hitoshi Okamoto and Hirohito Furui were involved with the album production.

Charting
The album reached the #81 rank in Oricon for the first week. It charted for two weeks.

Track listing

Usage in media
 "Kimi no Egao ga Nani yori mo Suki datta" was used as the ending theme for TV anime Detective Conan.
 "Sceario no Nai Life" was used as the ending theme in February for the Tokyo Broadcasting System Television program Hiruopi!
 "Sora Tooku/with" was used as the theme song for the short movie Crash Hitsugi.

References 

Giza Studio albums
Being Inc. albums
Japanese-language albums
2014 albums
Chicago Poodle albums